Ivo Donev (born 25 December 1959) is a Bulgarian, with Austrian passport, who is a professional chess and poker player.

Chess
His father, Hristo Donev was a national master at chess.

Ivo Donev won the 1989 CSSR International Chess Tournament, progressing him to International Master status. When he and his family emigrated to Austria in 1990, Donev taught for a chess school at $10 per hour to support his study of computer science. Ivo Donev is the author of the chess book "The most important ideas in the end game" in German language.

Poker
Donev studied the poker books of David Sklansky, Mason Malmuth, and Tom McEvoy and practiced using poker computer software.

Donev won a bracelet in the $1,500 Limit Omaha event at the 2000 World Series of Poker (WSOP), where he took home $85,800 for his first-place finish.

In 2002, Donev made his one and only appearance on Late Night Poker. He finished 5th out of an impressive field including Peter Costa, Dave Welch and Ram Vaswani. In 2003, Donev finished as a semi-finalist in the World Heads-Up Poker Championship.

He was a professional chess player before starting his poker career. His currently #1 in the Austrian All-Time Money list, and was the first Austrian to reach $1,000,000 in major tournament winnings.

World Series of Poker Money Finishes
 2000 $1,500 Limit Omaha - 1st place ($85,800)
 2001 $2,500 Seven Card Stud - 10th place ($5,530)
 2002 $1,500 Pot Limit Hold'em - 10th place ($5,670)
 2004 $1,500 Limit Hold'em Shootout - 6th place ($16,560)
 2004 $2,000 Pot Limit Hold'em - 3rd place ($47,700)
 2005 $2,000 Pot Limit Hold'em - 18th place ($6,955)
 2005 $2,500 Limit Hold'em - 21st place ($5,145)
 2005 $2,500 Pot Limit Hold'em - 10th place ($11,730)
 2008 £2,500 WSOPE - H.O.R.S.E.- 2nd place ($95,543)
 2009 $3,000 - N L Holdem- 64th place ($6,929)
 2010 $2,000 - Limit Holdem- 26th place ($6,237)
 2010 $2,500 - Limit/NL Holdem- 51st place ($4,512)
 2011 $1,500 - H.O.R.S.E.- 83rd place ($2,899)
 2011 $1,500 - Limit Hold'em Shootout - 55th place ($4,118)

 2016 $1,500 - H.O.R.S.E.- 22rd place ($6,188)
 2017 $50,000 - 8 Game - 4th place ($419.337)
 2017 $1,100 WSOPE - NL Holdem - 76th place ($1,640)
 2017 $550 - Pot Limit Omaha - 23th place ($1,578)
 2017 $1,100- No Limit Holdem - 34th place ($1,302)
 2019 $1,500 - H.O.R.S.E.- 68th place ($2,638)
 2019 $1,500 - 8 Game - 29th place ($4,841)
 2019 $1,000 - No Limit Holdem - 49th place ($12,281)
 2019 $1,500 - Pot Limit Omaha Hi/Lo- 78th place ($3,175)
 2019 $1,500 - Omaha Mix - 8th place ($16,075)
 2019 $550 - Pot Limit Omaha - 5th place ($10,900)
 2021 $210 -WSOP Online No Limit Holdem- 287th place ($1,438)

Personal life
He has two children, and lives in Lochau bei Bregenz, Austria.

His life and career is discussed in the James McManus book Positively Fifth Street.

References

External links 
 Ivo Donev's homepage
 Ivo Donev Hendon Mob tournament results
 

1959 births
Living people
Austrian chess players
Austrian poker players
World Series of Poker bracelet winners
Austrian people of Bulgarian descent
Bulgarian poker players
Bulgarian chess players